Raivo is an Estonian male given name. It is the Estonian form of the given name Robert.

People named Raivo include:
Raivo Adlas (born 1940), actor and theatre director
Raivo Aeg (born 1962), politician and police officer, former head director of Estonian Internal Security Service
Raivo Järvi (1954–2012), artist, radio personality and politician, also known under the pseudonym of Onu Raivo (Uncle Raivo)
Raivo Kotov (born 1976), architect
Raivo Lumiste (born 1969), military commander
Raivo Nõmmik (born 1977), football player
Raivo Palmaru (born 1951), journalist, sports figure and politician
Raivo Piirsalu, member of an Estonian heavy metal band Metsatöll
Raivo Põldaru (born 1951), politician
Raivo Puusepp (born 1960), architect
Raivo Seppo (born 1973), writer
Raivo E. Tamm (born 1965), Estonian actor and politician
Raivo Trass (1946–2022), actor and theatre director
Raivo Vare (born 1958), politician, entrepreneur, and transit and economic expert

References

Estonian masculine given names